The white-whiskered spinetail (Synallaxis candei) is a species of bird in the family Furnariidae. It is found in Colombia and Venezuela. Its natural habitats are subtropical or tropical dry forests and subtropical or tropical dry shrubland.

The bird is named after Admiral Antoine Marie Ferdinand de Maussion de Candé, an explorer of South America.

Description
The white-whiskered spinetail has a grayish-brown crown with sides of head black as well as a "whisker" stripe on both sides of face; as well as a mostly-brown head. Cinnamon rufous sides and breast and a white underbelly.

Behavior
Similar to the ruddy spinetail, The species actively "hops" and forages on the ground. It nests in tree cavities at ground level. They will often cock and lower their tail at times. (much like wrens)

References

white-whiskered spinetail
Birds of Colombia
Birds of Venezuela
white-whiskered spinetail
Taxonomy articles created by Polbot